The Letterman Digital Arts Center (LDAC), is an institution located in the Presidio, San Francisco, that has served as the combined home of Industrial Light & Magic, LucasArts, and Lucasfilm's marketing, online, and licensing units since 2005.

History
Opening ceremonies were held June 25, 2005. The $350 million, 850,000 square foot (79,000 m) center is home to 1,500 employees, who began moving there in July, 2005. The grounds were designed by landscape architect Lawrence Halprin, who has also restored San Francisco's Ghirardelli Square. The design architect for the buildings was Gensler, and architect of record was HKS, Inc.

The Lobby of Building B is open to the public during regular business hours and contains a gallery of Lucasfilm memorabilia including props and costumes from the Star Wars film series. On the patio near the entrance to Building B is a fountain featuring a life-sized statue of Yoda.

The Presidio is a former U.S. Army base. The arts center takes its name from its location on the former site of the army's Letterman Army Hospital, which was named for Dr. Jonathan Letterman, medical director for the Army of the Potomac in the U.S. Civil War.

The building earned a LEED Gold certification. One of the reasons was the building was built from the recycled remains of the building it replaced, the Letterman Army Hospital.

References

External links

 
 Lucasfilm.com: Letterman Digital and New Media Arts Center 
 Lucasfilm website
 360 panorama of Letterman Digital Arts Center Campus

Lucasfilm
Disney production studios
Office buildings in San Francisco
Cinema of the San Francisco Bay Area
Presidio of San Francisco
Buildings and structures completed in 2005
2005 establishments in California